Lower Earley is the southern portion of Earley civil parish and a large  suburb of Reading, within the English county of Berkshire. It forms part of (along with neighbouring Earley, Winnersh, Woodley and Shinfield) a large suburban conurbation of over 85,000 inhabitants adjoining east and south-east Reading. Lower Earley and Earley have a combined  population of around 32,000 and Lower Earley itself has developed since the late 1970s. By the mid 1980s it was considered to be the largest private housing development in the United Kingdom. Lower Earley forms a major part of Wokingham Borough. In 2014, the RG6 postcode area (which is nearly coterminous with the area of the civil parish) was rated one of the most desirable postcode areas to live in England.

History
Lower Earley was the part of Earley liberty in Sonning parish beside the River Loddon. It mostly consisted of Earley Upper Common and Lower Wood Common and a number of farms.  From 1977, the Lower Earley private estate was constructed. Three new primary schools were built (Hawkedon, Hillside Primary School and Radstock Primary School), together with a large supermarket complex, which opened in 1979, and a sports centre. In 1988, a second shopping area, Maiden Place, opened.

Facilities

Schools
There are three primary schools in Lower Earley, Hawkedon Primary School, Hillside Primary School and Radstock Primary School. An additional secondary school was planned roughly opposite the sports centre next to Rushey Way, possibly on the site next to the police station. However the school never materialised, and the land was built on. The main secondary schools that students from the area attend are The Bulmershe School, Maiden Erlegh School, The Forest School , The Emmbrook School and The Holt School, as well as some students attending the local single-sex grammar schools, Reading School and Kendrick School. There is also a pre-school next to Chalfont Park.

District Centre
There is a District Centre in the middle of Lower Earley.

Retail facilities
The Maiden Place Shopping Precinct was opened in 1988 on Kilnsea Drive.  Separate from this is a large Asda superstore, with several associated shops.

Local Nature Reserve
There is a local nature reserve called Pearman's Copse within the borders of Lower Earley.

Transport

Public transport
Earley railway station is not close to Lower Earley, as it is nearly 2 miles away. Instead, it serves Earley proper, and Woodley. 

Lower Earley has two main bus links to Central Reading, the 21, and 19b, run by Reading Buses. Service 21 runs 24 hours a day, seven days a week, starting from Kilnsea Drive to Reading Station via the University. The 19b runs every 60 minutes (Monday to Saturday) from Asda/Bradmore Way to Reading Station via the Royal Berkshire Hospital. There is also the 919 route which goes from Lower Earley to Reading School.

Reading Buses have also introduced a F33 bus service which serves people wishing to travel to Madjeski Stadium for Reading FC during home matches.

Strategic road network
The M4 motorway runs directly to the south of Lower Earley, with Junction 11 being the nearest junction. This major road serves places between London and Swansea, including Swindon, Bristol and Cardiff.

The Lower Earley Way connects the suburb to the A327 (for Reading, or Shinfield and Arborfield) and the A329 (for Reading, or Winnersh and Wokingham) roads, as well as to the A329(M) motorway (for Bracknell).

References

External links

Suburbs of Reading, Berkshire
Borough of Wokingham
Sonning